The 27s: The Greatest Myth of Rock & Roll is a 2008 book about the 27 Club, authored by Eric Segalstad and illustrated by Josh Hunter. Structured as a non-fiction narrative, it tells the history of rock & roll as seen through the lives and legacies of 34 musicians who all died at the age of 27. It was independently published, and distributed by Random House.

Summary
The book covers the lives of Robert Johnson, Brian Jones, Jimi Hendrix, Janis Joplin, Jim Morrison, Kurt Cobain and more than two dozen other musicians in an illustrated history, including 22 original portraits.

The book's storyline covers the history of rock in a largely linear fashion, although The 27s can also be read at random, with detours into the philosophy of Friedrich Nietzsche as it applies to music, numerology, astrology, and the claim that more rock stars have died at 27 than at any other age.

Illustrations
The book's illustrator, Josh Hunter, told The Huffington Post that, "The artwork tells its own story as well. There are these other layers, these hidden symbols and cryptic messages that, if you're alert to them, you're going to find we're packing in as well."

The 27s in the book
 Alexandre Levy
 Louis Chauvin
 Robert Johnson
 Nat Jaffe
 Jesse Belvin
 Rudy Lewis of The Drifters
 Malcolm Hale of Spanky and Our Gang
 Brian Jones of The Rolling Stones
 Alan Wilson of Canned Heat
 Jimi Hendrix
 Janis Joplin
 Arlester "Dyke" Christian of Dyke and the Blazers
 Jim Morrison of The Doors
 Ron "Pigpen" McKernan of the Grateful Dead
 Roger Lee Durham of Bloodstone
 Wallace Yohn of Chase
 David Michael Alexander of The Stooges
 Pete Ham of Badfinger
 Gary Thain of Keef Hartley Band and Uriah Heep
 Helmut Köllen of Triumvirat
 Chris Bell of Big Star
 D. Boon of the Minutemen
 Pete de Freitas of Echo & the Bunnymen
 Mia Zapata of The Gits
 Kurt Cobain of Nirvana
 Kristen Pfaff of Janitor Joe and Hole
 Richey James Edwards of Manic Street Preachers
 Fat Pat
 Freaky Tah of Lost Boyz
 Sean McCabe of Ink & Dagger
 Maria Serrano Serrano of Passion Fruit
 Jeremy Ward of De Facto and The Mars Volta
 Bryan Ottoson of American Head Charge
 Valentin Elizalde

Accolades
The 27s won silver in the 2009 Independent Publisher Book Award for Popular Culture.

References

2008 non-fiction books
Books about rock music